Zielona Góra is a Polish parliamentary constituency  that is coterminous with the Lubusz Voivodeship.  It elects twelve members of the Sejm.

The district has the number '8' and is named after the city of Zielona Góra.  It includes the counties of Gorzów, Krosno Odrzańskie, Międzyrzecz, Nowa Sól, Słubice, Strzelce-Drezdenko, Sulęcin, Świebodzin, Wschowa, Żagań, Żary, and Zielona Góra and the city counties of Gorzów Wielkopolski and Zielona Góra.

List of members

2019-2023

Footnotes

Electoral districts of Poland
Zielona Góra
Lubusz Voivodeship